George Mavrikos (born 1950) is the General Secretary of the World Federation of Trade Unions (WFTU) in Athens, Greece. He is a leading member of the Communist Party of Greece (KKE), and former member of Greek parliament. He is largely credited for having led the successful efforts to halt the decline of the World Federation of Trade Unions since the fall of the Soviet Union. Since his election as general secretary during the congress in Havana in 2005, the World Federation of Trade Unions has seen an increase in its number of affiliates and has successfully managed to recruit several trade union of importances in Western Europe.

Biography
George Mavrikos comes from the island of Skyros, a small island in the North Aegean Sea of two thousand citizens. His parents were farmers. He lived in Skyros until he was 15 years old (1950-1965) and then he moved in Athens. He got involved in the grass-root movement from his school years. During the 7 years of dictatorship in Greece (1967-1974) he was fired twice from his work in textile factories due to his trade union and political action. He participated in November 1973 in the Polytechnic uprising of students against the dictatorship in which 27 militants were killed by the guns of the army and the police. He was then arrested by the police.

He worked for 14 years in big factory of agricultural machinery where he was elected chairman of the workers union. In 1982 he was elected as organizational secretary of the Athens Labor Center (EKA). During 1985–1986 he studied in the Faculty of Political and Social Sciences in Moscow.

He was a member of the European Social Fund in the European Union representing the Greek General Confederation of Labour (GSEE). From 1993 to 1998 he was elected General Secretary of the Greek General Confederation of Labour (GSEE). He was also for 10 years President of the Institute of Greek Trade Union Movement History (ARISTOS).

During 1999–2007 he headed PAME (All Workers Militant Front). Because of his trade union and political action he has been brought to the employers and government court many times. George Mavrikos has started his trade union course within the Greek trade union movement from the base, from the factories; he did the same within the international one. His first contact with the WFTU was in 1976 in Sofia Bulgaria during a meeting of the sector of Agricultural products and in 1983 he attended a WFTU seminar in Budapest Hungary. During 1985-1986 he participated in various meetings of the WFTU in Moscow USSR.

In 1994 he took part in the 13th World Trade Union Congress in Damascus Syria, which was a crucial Congress for the course of the WFTU and for the international militant trade union movement in total. In 2000 in the 14th World Trade Union Congress in New Delhi India, he was elected Vice-President of the WFTU and Secretary of the WFTU Regional European Office. In the 15th Congress of the WFTU in Havana, Cuba, he was elected General Secretary. From 2007 until 2013 he was elected Member of the Hellenic Parliament with the Communist Party of Greece.

In the 16th Congress of WFTU in Athens Greece, George Mavrikos was re-elected General Secretary of WFTU and in the 17th World Trade Union Congress in Durban South Africa, he was reelected General Secretary of WFTU.

References

External links
 World Federation of Trade Unions Web Site

1950 births
Living people
Date of birth missing (living people)
Place of birth missing (living people)
Anti-revisionists
Communist Party of Greece politicians
Greek MPs 2007–2009
Greek trade unionists
People from Skyros